Nicolai Kjærgaard (born 29 July 1999) is a Danish racing driver who most recently competed in the GT World Challenge Europe Endurance Cup for Garage 59. Before making the move to sportscar racing in 2020, he was a BRDC British Formula 3 Championship runner-up and a Euroformula Open podium finisher.

Racing record

Racing career summary 

† As Kjaergaard was a guest driver, he was ineligible to score points.
* Season still in progress.

Complete F4 British Championship results 
(key) (Races in bold indicate pole position; races in italics indicate fastest lap)

Complete BRDC British Formula 3 Championship results 
(key) (Races in bold indicate pole position; races in italics indicate fastest lap)

Complete Euroformula Open Championship results 
(key) (Races in bold indicate pole position) (Races in italics indicate fastest lap)

Complete GT World Challenge results

GT World Challenge Europe Endurance Cup 
(Races in bold indicate pole position) (Races in italics indicate fastest lap)

GT World Challenge Europe Sprint Cup 
(key) (Races in bold indicate pole position) (Races in italics indicate fastest lap)

References

External links 

 

1999 births
Living people
Danish racing drivers
People from Esbjerg
British F4 Championship drivers
BRDC British Formula 3 Championship drivers
Euroformula Open Championship drivers
Blancpain Endurance Series drivers
Asian Le Mans Series drivers
Fortec Motorsport drivers
Carlin racing drivers